Brachysomida is a genus of beetles in the family Cerambycidae, containing the following species:

 Brachysomida atra (LeConte, 1850)
 Brachysomida bivittata (Say, 1824)
 Brachysomida californica (LeConte, 1851)
 Brachysomida rugicollis Linsley & Chemsak, 1972
 Brachysomida vittigera Linsley & Chemsak, 1972

References

Lepturinae